Peter Tompkins   (April 19, 1919 – January 23, 2007) was an American journalist, World War II Office of Strategic Services (OSS) spy in Rome, and best-selling author.

Biography
He was a war correspondent for the New York Herald Tribune and CBS during World War II. In 1943 he was recruited by the OSS and utilized as an undercover agent in Italy in 1944. He worked closely with Maurizio Giglio, an Italian policeman who was an OSS secret agent. In 1962 he published his diary, titled A Spy in Rome (New York: Simon & Schuster).

His best-known books are The Secret Life of Plants (1973), Secrets of the Great Pyramid (1971; paperback reprint, 1997), and Mysteries of the Mexican Pyramids (1976). His Secrets of the Great Pyramid, Mysteries of the Mexican Pyramids and The Magic of Obelisks have become classics of "New Age" literature.

In 1977, he hosted a documentary film called Secrets of the Bermuda Triangle, directed by Donald Brittain.

References

External links
Associated Press obituary, International Herald Tribune, January 24, 2007
2004 profile of Peter Tompkins in Italian magazine "The American."
Article by Tompkins on the OSS and Italian Partisans in World War II at Central Intelligence Agency
Article on Spies in WWII by Tompkins

Secrets of the Bermuda Triangle on the Internet Archive

American spies
American male journalists
People of the Office of Strategic Services
1919 births
2007 deaths
20th-century American journalists
American expatriates in Italy